Duau may refer to:

Duau (god), Ancient Egyptian god
Duau language of Papua New Guinea
Duau Rural LLG of Papua New Guinea